Michel Grangier (born 2 April 1948) is a French former wrestler who competed in the 1972 Summer Olympics and in the 1976 Summer Olympics.

References

External links
 

1948 births
Living people
Olympic wrestlers of France
Wrestlers at the 1972 Summer Olympics
Wrestlers at the 1976 Summer Olympics
French male sport wrestlers